Harold Ernest Arundel Moody (1 November 1915 – 12 September 1986) was a British shot putter.

Athletics career
Moody won a silver medal at the 1950 British Empire Games in Auckland, New Zealand.

He also competed at the 1948 Olympics.

Moody joined the South London Harriers in 1946 and quickly made his mark, earning his first international honours for GB v France when he won the Shot before taking part in the Olympics in 1948 and the British Empire Games. Moody emigrated to New Zealand where he joined the Lynndale AA & HC where he continued to compete for several years, winning the NZ Shot in 1952/53 and Discus in 1953.

Personal life
In 1957, Moody became a naturalised New Zealand citizen. For six years, he served as mayor of Glen Eden in Auckland.

Moody died on 12 September 1986, and his ashes were buried in Waikumete Cemetery, Auckland.

References

External links
 

1915 births
1986 deaths
Athletes (track and field) at the 1948 Summer Olympics
British male shot putters
Olympic athletes of Great Britain
Commonwealth Games medallists in athletics
Commonwealth Games silver medallists for England
Athletes from London
Athletes (track and field) at the 1950 British Empire Games
Mayors of places in the Auckland Region
Naturalised citizens of New Zealand
English emigrants to New Zealand
Burials at Waikumete Cemetery
Medallists at the 1950 British Empire Games